Plana Peak is a mostly ice-covered peak on the Levski Ridge, Tangra Mountains, Livingston Island in the South Shetland Islands, Antarctica.  Surmounting Huron Glacier to the north and its tributaries to the east and west. First ascent by D. Boyanov, N. Petkov and A. Shopov on 8 January 2015. The peak is named after Plana Mountain in Western Bulgaria.

Location
The peak is located 2.21 km north-northwest of Great Needle Peak (Falsa Aguja Peak), 2.66 km northeast of Levski Peak and 2.45 km west-northwest of Helmet Peak (Bulgarian topographic survey Tangra 2004/05, and mapping in 2005 and 2009).

Maps
 L.L. Ivanov et al. Antarctica: Livingston Island and Greenwich Island, South Shetland Islands. Scale 1:100000 topographic map. Sofia: Antarctic Place-names Commission of Bulgaria, 2005.
 L.L. Ivanov. Antarctica: Livingston Island and Greenwich, Robert, Snow and Smith Islands. Scale 1:120000 topographic map.  Troyan: Manfred Wörner Foundation, 2009.

References
 Plana Peak. SCAR Composite Antarctic Gazetteer
 Bulgarian Antarctic Gazetteer. Antarctic Place-names Commission. (details in Bulgarian, basic data in English)

External links
 Plana Peak. Copernix satellite image

Mountains of Antarctica
Tangra Mountains